This Central Américan country made its debut in the OTI festival in 1974 when the contest was being held in the Mexican tourist city of Acapulco. 

Guatemala and its OTI member TV Station, Televisiete participated in the event almost uninterruptedly and withdrew only twice, in 1978 and 1979. The participation of Ricardo Arjona, who represented his country in 1987, is of particular note. Although he only managed to get the 12th place, he rose quickly to stardom.

History 
Although Guatemala sent some well known names to the OTI Festival, this country had a lustreless trajectory in the festival. The Guatemalan Broadcaster never managed to win the festival. This country placed second in 1974, their debut year, with Tanya Zea. The country managed to reach the top 10 again in 1976 with Hugo Leonel Baccaro and in 1980 with Grupo Madrigal. Since then, the Central American Country got only moderate placings.

National Final 
Following the example of México, Chile and later Cuba, Televisiete also created its own national selection process for Guatemala. The Guatemalan national OTI festival was celebrated every year in Guatemala City since the debut of the country in the festival. 

As in the other countries where a preselection was organised, the winner act, who would represent the country in the Song Contest was elected by a professional jury who voted for their favourite performers.

Contestants

References 

OTI Festival
Guatemalan music